The Town and the City is the twelfth studio album released by rock band Los Lobos in 2006, to generally positive critical reception. The title of the album is taken from the debut novel by Jack Kerouac. The album explores themes of longing, disillusionment, and loneliness in the Mexican-American immigration experience.

Track listing

Personnel 

 David Hidalgo – vocals, guitar, accordion, fiddle, requinto jarocho
 Louie Pérez – vocals, guitar, drums, jarana
 Cesar Rosas – vocals, guitar, bajo xexto
 Conrad Lozano – vocals, bass, guitarron
 Steve Berlin – keyboards, horns

Additional musicians

 Cougar Estrada – drums, percussion

Production
 Los Lobos – producer
 Robert Carranza – engineer, mixing (3, 4, 11, 12)
 Mark Johnson – engineer
 Richard Barron – engineer
 David Hidalgo – engineer
 Jed Burtoft – assistant engineer
 Tchad Blake – mixing (except 3, 4, 11, 12)
 Stephen Marsh – mastering
 Stephanie Villa – mastering assistant
 Louie Perez – art direction
 Al Quattrocchi – art direction
 Jeff Smith – art direction
 David Snow – creative direction
 Tornado Design – design
 Jaime Hernandez – illustration
 James Minchin III – photography

References

External links 
 Metacritic page

2006 albums
Los Lobos albums
Hollywood Records albums